Pochaina is a station on Kyiv Metro's Obolonsko–Teremkivska line. The station was opened on 19 December 1980 in the Petrivka neighborhood of the Podilskyi Raion of Kyiv near Pochaina Railway Station. It was designed by I.L. Maslenkov, T.A. Tselikovska, A.S. Krushynskyi, and F.M. Zaremba.

The station is located shallow underground and consists of a central hall with columns. The walls along the tracks have been covered with yellow marble and decorated with two abstract reliefs. Hanging above one of the entrances into the station's hall is a colorful mosaic. The station is accessible by passenger tunnels; the northern one leading to a square, the southern one — to Pochaina Railway Station.

On the 8 February 2018, Kyiv city council voted to rename Petrivka which commemorated communist politician Grigory Petrovsky to Pochaina after the Pochaina river (in which Prince Volodymyr baptized Kyiv citizens), according to the decommunization law.

References

External links
 Kyiv Metro — Station description and photographs 
 Metropoliten.kiev.ua — Station description and photographs 

Kyiv Metro stations
Railway stations opened in 1980
1980 establishments in Ukraine